Mommy Hurt My Head, are a Danish electronic music band which formed in 2006, in Århus, Denmark. The group's first and original line-up consisted of Der Doktor (vocals and samples), Abn pAn (synth, programming, vocals, mixing, production) and Vomitus (synth, programming). Vomitus left the band, just before the band's first concert (as warm-up for fellow dane Leæther Strip).
Néff3 joined the band as live member, shortly before the band's first concert.

History

Mommy Hurt My Head origins date back to before 2002, when Der Doktor wanted to start a neo folk project under the name "Mommy Hurt My Head". But six years later changed Der Doktor his mind about the musical style then Abn pAn and Vomitus convinced him to start a new oldschool EBM project.
Shortly after the band's first demo tracks was completed, and uploaded on their MySpace account, they were signed on the Swedish label Progress Productions, led by Project-X frontman Torny Gottberg.
Torny got a demo cd from Der Doktor, while Der Doktor was arranging a double concert with the Swedish industrial band Necro Facility and one of Abn pAn's sideprojects called pAn and the G9 Slug (where Der Doktor is a livemember).
Shortly afterwards, they got signed on the label, and delivered the track "Nothing Zero Option (After the pills)" on the labels Born/Evolve/Progress//2 sampler.
After that, they started to work on their debut album and doing live shows. 
The band has played live in Denmark, Sweden and Germany.  Both of the Danish concerts was as warm-up for Leæther Strip.  The debut album "Mommy Hurt My Head" was done in 2009, and was released in November 2009, scoring high ratings at several alternative music magazines, including Sonic Seducer.

DiscographyMommy Hurt My Head'' (2009)

See also
 Leæther Strip

References
 https://web.archive.org/web/20100620174022/http://www.brutalresonance.com/?public_pageid=showreview&id=review_4c15db1fd9f0c152358593

External links

 Progress Productions page
 Facebook fan-page
 The Official Mommy Hurt My Head MySpace.com page

Danish musical trios
Danish electronic music groups
Synthpop groups
Danish industrial music groups
People from Aarhus
Musical groups established in 2006
2006 establishments in Denmark